Shmuel Schneurson was a leader of the underground Zionist movement Hechalutz in the Soviet Union from 1922 to 1928. Though he had the option of remaining in British Palestine during his 1927 visit, he chose to return to the USSR to organize underground Zionist activities. He was arrested in February 1928 and sentenced to a correction camp in the Ural Mountains, followed by a three-year sentence in Siberia. In 1934, he was released and returned to Moscow. After applying for an exit permit to return to Palestine, he was promptly rearrested and sentenced. His final whereabouts remain unknown. In 1946, his former landlady received a letter informing her of his death.

Schneurson is a descendant of Rabbi Shneur Zalman of Liadi, the founder of Chabad hasidism. He is among a number of descendants of the great rabbi, who participated in underground Zionist activities. Colleagues of Schneurson who shared his ancestry within the movement included sisters Miriam and Leah Lein. The former made aliyah in 1923, and the latter was arrested and disappeared in 1927. There were also the brothers Tuviah and Solomon Margolin, who also came from a Lubavitcher background. They were sentenced to lengthy prison terms and died in the late 1940s. Their mother, also a committed Zionist, was released in 1951, and unsuccessfully attempted to apply for aliyah. She was buried in 1953, "in accordance with Jewish custom."

Sources
Teller, Judd L. "The Kremlin, the Jews, and the Middle East" Pages 55–57. Publisher Thomas Yoseloff, 1957

Soviet dissidents
Russian Orthodox Jews
Russian people who died in prison custody
Prisoners who died in Soviet detention
Schneersohn family
20th-century Russian people
Year of birth missing
Year of death missing